The Vertical Kilometer World Circuit is an annual international circuit of vertical kilometer (a skyrunning discipline) born in 2017 as a spin-off of Skyrunner World Series. The Vertical World Circuit announced the 2017 VWC calendar featuring ten races, including a new venue: Osaka.

2017 edition
The winners of the first edition were the Norwegian Stian Angermund and the Spanish Laura Orgué.

Results
The circuit consists of 17 races that are held from May to October.

Men's final standings

Women's final standings

2018 edition

See also
 Skyrunner World Series

References

External links
 International Skyrunning Federation
 Vertical Kilometer World Circuit

 
Skyrunning competitions
Sports competition series
Recurring sporting events established in 2017
Vertical kilometer running competitions